Loy or Loys is both a given name and a surname. Notable people with the name include:

Given name:
Loy Allen Bowlin (1909–1995), outsider artist     
Loy Allen Jr. (born 1966), former NASCAR driver
Loy Hanning, Major League Baseball pitcher in 1939 and 1942
Loy W. Henderson (1892–1986), United States Foreign Service Officer
Loy Hering, (c. 1484–1564), German Renaissance sculptor
Loy Mendonsa, Indian film singer
Loy Petersen (born 1945), retired American professional basketball player
Loy Vaught (born 1968), retired American basketball player
Loy F. Weaver (born 1942), politician from Louisiana, USA
Loys of Gruuthuse (c. 1422–1492), better known as Lewis de Bruges, lord of Gruuthuse
Loys Louis Bourgeois (composer) (c. 1510–1560), French composer and music theorist of the Renaissance
Loÿs Delteil (1869–1927), French engraver and lithographer, publisher, dealer, and art historian

Surname:
Angie Loy (born 1982),  American field hockey forward
Brendan Loy, American blogger
Christof Loy (born 1962), German opera director
David Loy (born 1947), American Buddhist philosopher
Egon Loy (born 1931), German former professional football goalkeeper
Frank E. Loy, American diplomat and former United States Under Secretary of State for Global Affairs
James Loy (born 1942), United States Coast Guard admiral, former TSA administrator, former Deputy Secretary of the U.S. Department of Homeland Security
Joseph F. Loy (1824-1875), American politician
Julien Loy (born 1976), French triathlete
Matthias Loy (1828–1915), American Lutheran theologian
Mina Loy (1882–1966), British artist, poet, playwright, novelist, futurist, actor, Christian Scientist, designer of lamps and bohemian
Myrna Loy (1903–1993), American motion picture actress
Nanni Loy (1925–1995), Italian film, theatre and TV director
Rachel Loy, American solo artist
Rory Loy (born 1988), Scottish footballer
Tristan Loy (born 1973), French long distance and marathon speed skater and inline speed skater
William A. Loy (1895-1982), American politician
François De Loys (1892–1935), Swiss oil geologist and discoverer of "Loy's Ape"

See also
Saint Loye, better known as Saint Eligius (c. 588-660)
the title character of "Helen O'Loy", a 1938 science fiction story by Lester del Rey

Surnames from given names